The USS Preston was a blockade-running steamer captured by the Union Navy during the American Civil War.

She was placed in service in Port Royal, South Carolina, by the Union Navy as a gunboat during blockade operations against the Confederate States of America.

Service history
Preston, a "cigar shaped steamer" used to transport cotton, was captured in the harbor of Charleston, South Carolina in February 1865. Renamed Preston and operated under the command of Acting Ensign William Thomas, she was assigned to the South Atlantic Blockading Squadron and stationed at Port Royal, South Carolina until August 1865. Then ordered north, she arrived at Washington, D.C. on 21 August and was placed in ordinary. She was sold at auction on 17 September 1868.

See also

Blockade runners of the American Civil War
Blockade mail of the Confederacy

References

Ships of the Union Navy
Steamships of the United States Navy
Gunboats of the United States Navy
American Civil War patrol vessels of the United States